John Baron may refer to:

John Baron (academic) (died 1722), English academic administrator at the University of Oxford
John Baron (politician) (born 1959), English Member of Parliament
John Baron (physician) (1786–1851), English physician
John Baron (priest) (1677–1739), Anglican priest
John Baron (pseudonym), a pseudonym used by Donald Trump in the 1980s

See also
John Barron (disambiguation)
John Barran (disambiguation)
Jonathan Baron (born 1944), American psychology professor